Wiluyu (Aymara wila blood, blood-red, uyu corral,  "red corral", Hispanicized spelling Viluyo) is a mountain in the Andes of southern Peru, about  high. It is located in the  Puno Region, Puno Province, on the border of the districts Mañazo and Tiquillaca. It lies south of the mountain Chuqi Liwa (Choquelihua).

The Wanuni River originates near the mountain. It flows to the Uturunqani River in the south.

References

Mountains of Puno Region
Mountains of Peru